The 1935 Dartmouth Indians football team was an American football team that represented Dartmouth College as an independent during the 1935 college football season. In their second season under head coach Earl Blaik, the Indians compiled a 8–2 record. John Kenny was the team captain.

Frank Nairne was the team's leading scorer, with 54 points, from nine touchdowns.

Dartmouth played its home games at Memorial Field on the college campus in Hanover, New Hampshire.

Schedule

References

Dartmouth
Dartmouth Big Green football seasons
Dartmouth Indians football